Nicolas Vouilloz (born 8 February 1976) is a French professional mountain biker and former professional rally driver.

He won the Downhill Mountain Bike World Championships ten times, starting as a junior in 1992 and finishing his career with his 10th victory in 2002, only placing lower in 2000 finishing 8th. He also won sixteen World cup Downhill races and is widely considered as the greatest male downhill racer of all time. 

Vouilloz was born in Nice, France. In 2000, he started rallying in local and then national rally series. He debuted in the World Rally Championship at the 2001 Monte Carlo Rally. His best result in the WRC is ninth place at the 2004 Wales Rally GB, driving a Peugeot 206 WRC for the Bozian Racing team. Being a Peugeot protégé and development driver, Peugeot Sport paired Vouilloz with experienced codriver Denis Giraudet (winner of the 1994 WRC title with countryman Didier Auriol).

Following Peugeot's decision to pull out of the WRC, Vouilloz competed on a full-time basis in the Intercontinental Rally Challenge from 2007 to 2009. He was runner-up in 2007 with three wins. In 2008, he won the championship in a Peugeot 207 S2000, ahead of Belgian teammate Freddy Loix, with one win, six second-place finishes and top 5 finishes in each race. In 2009 he finished fourth with the same car, collecting three podiums but no wins.

After several years absence from the mountain biking scene, Vouilloz returned to race professionally in 2007 at the fourth round of the World Cup in Champery, Switzerland. He races for Lapierre Ultimate Cycles and is currently involved in the Enduro World Series.

Complete World Rally Championship results

IRC results

Palmarès
World Cup Downhill Champion : 1995, 1996, 1998, 1999, 2000
Downhill World Champion : 1995, 1996, 1997, 1998, 1999, 2001, 2002
Downhill Junior World Champion : 1992, 1993, 1994

References

External links

Official site

French rally drivers
Downhill mountain bikers
1976 births
Intercontinental Rally Challenge drivers
World Rally Championship drivers
European Rally Championship drivers
Living people
French male cyclists
Sportspeople from Nice
UCI Mountain Bike World Champions (men)
French mountain bikers
Cyclists from Nice
Peugeot Sport drivers
Škoda Motorsport drivers